Tramlapiola sylvestris is a species of crickets in the subfamily Pteroplistinae, found in Vietnam. No subspecies are included in the Catalogue of Life.

References 

Invertebrates of Southeast Asia
Ensifera
Insects described in 1990